Rev. Fr. Giacomo Fenicio (1558 - 1632), also known as Arthunkal Veluthachan, Jacomo Fenicio or Jacob Fenicio was an Italian Jesuit priest, scholar, theologian, and missionary in India.

He served in South India as a priest and missionary from 1584 to 1632. He was one of the first Europeans who researched and authored scholastic literature about Hinduism. He was popular known among Christians of Kerala and known as Arthunkal Veluthachan or fair skinned father of Arthunkal.

Personal life

Fenicio was born in Capua, Italy in 1558. He arrived in India in 1582 and spent the next 48 years in South India. He became the second vicar of St. Andrew's Basilica, Arthunkal in Kerala after the death of the first vicar, Fr Gasper Pius, who built the church. Fenicio was well known for his tolerance towards other religions. He was popular among the local people and was affectionately called Arthunkal Veluthachan. Fenicio died in Cochin in 1632. It is said that he had significant interest and knowledge in Hindu culture and martial art of Kalaripayattu.

See also
 St. Andrew's Basilica, Arthunkal

References

1558 births
1632 deaths
16th-century Italian Jesuits
16th-century Indian Jesuits
Italian theologians
Indian theologians
Roman Catholic missionaries in India
Jesuit missionaries in India
People from Capua
Italian emigrants to India
Indian people of Italian descent
Christianity in Kerala
Christian clergy from Kochi